Cacocharis is a genus of moths belonging to the subfamily Olethreutinae of the family Tortricidae.

Species
Cacocharis albimacula Walsingham, 1892
Cacocharis canofascia (Forbes, 1930)
Cacocharis cymotoma (Meyrick, 1917)

See also
List of Tortricidae genera

References

External links
tortricidae.com

Tortricidae genera
Taxa named by Thomas de Grey, 6th Baron Walsingham
Olethreutinae